Dulce Nombre de María is a town and municipality in the Chalatenango Department of El Salvador.

Dulce Nombre de María is bordered by San Fernando to the north, San Rafael and Santa Rita  to the south, Comalapa to the east and San Francisco Morazan to the west.

History

Dulce Nombre de Maria was established in 1790 by several Spanish families who were sent by Baron Carandelet, general captain of Guatemala's Kingdom.
It received the title of village on April 21, 1910,
and it became an official district of Chalatenango on July 15, 1919.

In 1980 according to mayor Sr. Antonio Yuloa, the original population was divided in two villages.

The town has a church known as the Iglesia de Dulce Nombre de Maria. On one bell of Church is written "White NS Dulce Nombre de Maria, 1827" dedicated to Dulce Nombre de María. It was written when Leon Ventura was priest.

Dulce Nombre de Maria had belonged to the San Salvador department since June 12, 1824 to May 22, 1835, and to the Cuscatlan department from May 22, 1835 to February 14, 1855, however since February 14, 1855, Dulce Nombre de Maria has belongs to the Chalatenango department

Administrative Division
Dulce Nombre de Maria is divided into 10 cantones and 35 caserios including:

Cuevitas
Cuevitas
Plan Grande
El Cerro Verde
Chorro Blanco
Chorro Blanco
El Jocote
El Plan
El Zángano
El Camotal
El Común
El Común
El naranjo
Las Alas
El Ocotal
Plan del Ojo De Agua
El Chupadero
El Plan Chino
El Quebracho
Cueva del Ermitaño
Los Pitos
El Manzano
El Rosario
El Rosario
La Laguna
Gutiérrez
Gutiérrez
La Quinta
Cerrito de Piedra
Los Achiotes
Los Achiotes
La Cumbre
El Terrero
Los Gonzáles
Los Encuentros
Los Encuentros
El Chupadero
El Calero
La Mantequilla
La Chacra
Sitio Arriba
Sitio Arriba
Sitio Abajo
Sitio Abajo

Religion
In Dulce Nombre de Maria, there are several religions but the main ones are Catholics and Protestants. However, Catholicism is the most important religion which has more parishioners specially visible on Sundays.

Division of the city

Dulce Nombre de Maria is divided in five barrios among them:

Barrio de la Concepcion
Located to the south of city, la Concepcion is named on behalf of the Virgin of the Immaculate Conception which is celebrated on December 8. Francisco Gavidia School is located here as well.

Barrio El Calvario
It is located to the west of city, this barrio is dedicated to our lady of Guadalupe, and also in this one is located some Protestant churches like "El Principe de Paz".
Moreover this barrio celebrates its holiday on December 7 in each year

Barrio El Carmen
It is located to the east of city, this barrio is dedicated to our lady of Carmen, and also in this one is located Instituto Nacional de Dulce Nombre de Maria.
Moreover this barrio celebrates its holiday on December 9 in each year

Barrio El Centro
It is located in city's heart, this barrio is dedicated to our lady of Dulce Nombre de Maria, in addition is dedicated whole city. and also in this one is located Catholic Church.
Moreover this barrio celebrates its holiday on December 11 in each year

Barrio San Jose
It is located to the North of city, this barrio is dedicated to San Jose, maybe this one is the largest of the city because keeps growing to north
Moreover this barrio celebrates its holiday on December 10 in each year

External links
Dulce Nombre de María, Chalatenango, El Salvador
Pictures of Dulce Nombre de Maria

Municipalities of the Chalatenango Department